Heidedal is a suburb of the city of Bloemfontein in South Africa.

Education 
 Petunia Secondary School
 Heatherdale Secondary School
 Dr. Blok Secondary School
 Heide Primary School
 Joe Solomon Primary School
 Olympia Primary School
 Credence Primary School

Recreation 
 Clive Solomon Stadium - Rugby, Football, Netball, Cricket.
 Billy Murison Stadium - Football, Athletics, Tennis.
 Heidedal Public Swimming Pool

Religion 
Heidedal has a diverse Christian population, and a Muslim population of note.

Christian denominations 
 Uniting Reformed Church of Southern Africa - Heidedal South
 Heidedal Methodist Church
 Anglican Church - Heidedal Parish
 Uniting Reformed Church of Southern Africa - Heatherdale
 Roman Catholic Church in South Africa - Heidedal Parish 
 Apostolic Faith Mission 
 Evangelical Lutheran Church - Heidedal

Islam 
 Miftahuddin Islamic Institute Masjid

Sports

Football 
 Heidedal United FC
 Bubchu United FC
 Kingston FC

Rugby 
 Bloemfontein Crusaders Rugby Club

Shopping 
 Heidedal Twin City Mall
 Lemo Mall

Notable people 
 Gayton McKenzie, South African businessman and politician.

References

External links 
 http://www.sahistory.org.za/article/list-women-involved-women%E2%80%99s-struggle-south-africa-1900-1994

Suburbs of Bloemfontein